is the mayor of Nanjō, Okinawa and a former member of the House of Representatives of Japan, representing Okinawa 4th district (southern Okinawa Island and the Sakishima Islands). He was elected in the 2009 Japanese general election. He is an outspoken proponent of the removal of American bases from Okinawa.

On 21 January 2018, Zukeran was elected mayor of Nanjō after defeating three-term incumbent Keishun Koja. He took office on 12 February.

Electoral history

References 

1958 births
Living people
People from Okinawa Prefecture
Central Washington University alumni
Members of the House of Representatives (Japan)
Democratic Party of Japan politicians
21st-century Japanese politicians